Alex Lee (born 16 March 1970) is an English musician. He has played guitar and keyboards for Goldfrapp, Massive Attack, Suede, Placebo, Strangelove and The Blue Aeroplanes amongst others. He has also worked as musical director with Florence And The Machine, Marina & The Diamonds and for the Royal Shakespeare Company as well as composing regularly for film and television.

Biography
Lee joined The Blue Aeroplanes in 1989, around the time that they signed to Ensign Records. He played on the 1990 album Swagger and the 1995 album Rough Music.

References

External links

Alex Lee Official Website

English pop musicians
1970 births
Living people
Musicians from Bristol
Placebo (band) members
Suede (band) members
Britpop musicians